Gel bracelets (or jelly bracelets) are a type of wristband often made from silicone.

Gel bracelets

Gel bracelets usually have a rectangular or circular cross-section. They are stretchy and come in a variety of colors. They have been popular in waves throughout the Western world and elsewhere since the 1980s.

Charity awareness wristbands 

Awareness bracelet wristbands carry messages demonstrating the wearer's support of a cause or charitable organization. The silicone wristband first became popular in 2004 with the Livestrong yellow band which was set up by American cyclist Lance Armstrong to raise awareness of cancer.

The wristbands are often seen by young people as trendier than traditional charity pins. The wristbands have also become a popular tool used in fundraising, as both the wider and thinner bands are cheap to custom manufacture. The price of these wristbands varies depending on the particular campaign but is often $1 or £1, and the majority of the money usually goes towards the charity or cause involved.

Urban legend of sex bracelets

During a resurgence in popularity in 2003, gel bracelets became the subject of a widespread urban legend linking them to a supposed sex game, explaining their popularity among young teenagers. They were subsequently dubbed "sex bracelets". According to rumors, people who wore the jewelry implied they were willing to engage in various acts with whoever pulled them from their wrists. The acts ranged from hugging to kissing to sexual intercourse and were determined by the bracelet's color.

In October 2003, the rumors were prominent enough in Alachua Elementary School in Gainesville, Florida that the principal banned the bracelets to avert disruption and inappropriate comments about them. They were subsequently banned in other schools in Florida and elsewhere. The effectors of these early bans did not insinuate that the rumors were true; however, some later media reports suggested that they may have been generating a moral panic. The British press reported on the supposed meanings of the band's colors in 2005.

A very similar set of stories surfaced in the British media in 2009, in which the bracelets were allegedly nicknamed shag bands. Similar stories circulated widely in Brazil during the 2009/2010 summer, where the bracelets were referred to as pulseiras do sexo. In March 2010, a 13-year-old girl in Brazil was raped by three teenage boys after one of them snatched the bracelet she was wearing. The police stated that the crime was motivated by the use of sex bracelets.

Different versions of the legend associate different colors with sexual acts (similar to the handkerchief code). For example, purple might be associated with kissing, red with lap dancing, and black with intercourse. Some versions say the sexual activity occurred at parties held for the purpose, making them similar to contemporary rumors of "rainbow parties", a gathering where girls wearing varying shades of lipstick supposedly take turns fellating their male counterparts, leaving an array of colors on their penises. Other tales of teenage sex parties have circulated at various times. Folklorist Barbara Mikkelson of snopes.com associates the "sex bracelet" stories with similar ones of the past. In the 1970s, pull tabs from aluminum cans and labels from beer bottles were supposedly considered "sex coupons" and obligated any girl presented with one to sleep with the bearer. By the 1990s, the rumors shifted to include an assortment of plastic items, including some worn as bracelets. According to Mikkelson, there is likely little truth behind the stories, and the vast majority of teenagers who contact her site express shock and disappointment that so many have believed them.

At least one particular type of gel bracelet called the MY Single Band was specifically designed to advertise the wearer's relationship status. The response to this bracelet was largely critical, with Natasha Burton of Cosmopolitan saying she doubted men would look for such a bracelet given that she was still approached even while wearing her engagement ring. The staff of Glamour were reportedly uncomfortable with the concept, and Eliana Dockterman of Time magazine even compared it to wearing one's OkCupid profile on their T-shirt.

See also 

 Awareness ribbon – developed from 1917 through 1986 to symbolize remembrance of service members and other causes
 Gospel bracelet
 Lockets and eye miniatures – mementos of loved ones c. 1785
Lock of hair – memento dating to antiquity
 POW bracelet – from 1970 to 1976, engraved with name of an American serviceman captured or missing during the Vietnam War

Notes

References

External links
 Guide to wristbands (CBBC Newsround)

2010s fashion
Clothing controversies
Bracelets
Sexual urban legends
1980s fashion
1990s fads and trends
2000s fads and trends